Nyeri Airport  is an airport in Nyeri Count, Kenya.

Location
Nyeri Airport is located  the northeast of Nyeri, in the Kenyan Central Highlands.

The geographic coordinates of this airport are:0° 20' 24.00"S, 36° 54' 36.00"E (Latitude:-0.34000; Longitude:36.91000).

Overview
Nyeri Airport is a small civilian airport, serving the Central Highlands town of Nyeri and surrounding communities. The airport is due to undergo development with the building of a terminal building and increase of the runway length to 2000m under the new county government. Kenyan Air Force FOB Nyeri is located near Nyeri Airport, and there may be Kenyan Air Force assets situated in the perimeter.

Airlines and destinations
There is no regular, scheduled airline service to Nyeri Airport at this time.

See also
 Kenya Airports Authority
 Kenya Civil Aviation Authority
 List of airports in Kenya

References

External links
 Location of Nyeri Airport At Google Maps
  Website of Kenya Airports Authority
 List of Airports In Kenya

Airports in Kenya
Central Province (Kenya)
Nyeri County